Hosta most commonly refers to:
 Hosta, a genus of about 23 to 45 species of plants

Hosta may also refer to:

Places 
 Hosta, Pyrénées-Atlantiques, France
 Hosta, Škofja Loka, Slovenia